Live in Hollywood is the second live album by Mexican pop band RBD, released on April 4, 2006, in the United States and Mexico. Live in Hollywood was recorded on RBD's first concert in Los Angeles, California on January 21, 2006, at the Pantages Theatre, as part of the group's 'Tour Generación 2006' world tour. The live album was accompanied by the same-day release of a live concert DVD, also titled Live in Hollywood. The acoustic music that appears on the album was recorded live, though in a way posing a different style to the group's previous Tour Generación RBD En Vivo.

On April 19, 2006, the first single off the album was released, a new song titled "No Pares", which was sung solely by Dulce María. The song proved to be a total success on Mexican radio. The song was written by former Mexican pop star Lynda Thomas and producer Carlos Lara.

Background and release

The live album was recorded on January 21, 2006, at the show performed in the Pantages Theatre in Los Angeles, California, which was part of RBD's second concert tour, titled 'Tour Generación 2006' or 'Nuestro Amor Tour'. The concert was the first the band performed in the United States. The show itself had a visually colorful and acoustic style, even counting with the support of a gospel choir.

One of the members of RBD, Christian Chávez, explained during an interview that the songs recorded belonged to the Nuestro Amor album, the difference being that this time the songs were acoustic, and added: "There are many instruments, strings, percussions, and the finished product is something very cool, more intimate".

The album was simultaneously put on sale on April 4, 2006, in Mexico, Brazil, and the United States. The live concert DVD recorded on January 21, 2006, was also released the same day. In Spain, the live album was released on December 11, 2006. The release is mostly composed of the songs included in RBD's second studio album, Nuestro Amor.

Singles
On April 19, 2006, the first single off the album was released, titled "No Pares". The song is performed solely by Dulce María. The song was written by Lynda Thomas and producer Carlos Lara. The single's music video was taken from footage in the live DVD, and was released to promote  it. In 2007, the song won the award for 'Latin Song of the Year' at the 2007 Orgullosamente Latino Awards.

Commercial performance

In North America, the album became a commercial success. In Mexico, the release reached #14 on the Mexican Albums Chart. It was certified Gold by the Asociación Mexicana de Productores de Fonogramas y Videogramas (AMPROFON) for the sales of 50,000 copies in the country. In the United States, the album peaked at #120 on the Billboard 200, where it charted for five weeks. The album reached #4 and position #6 on the Billboard Latin Pop Albums and Billboard Top Latin Albums charts, respectively. With that, the RIAA certified the album 2× Platinum (Latin) for the sales of 120,000 copies.

In Europe, the album also received a favorable reception. In Spain, the album debuted at number #41 on the Spain Albums Chart, peaking at #34 the following week.

In South America, the album also received a good reception since its release. In Brazil, the album reached the #2 spot on the Brazilian Albums Chart, and remained on the ranking for twelve weeks. In Chile, the live release reached #4 on the IFPI chart.

Track listings

 Notes
"Me Voy" is the Spanish cover version of Kelly Clarkson's "Gone", originally released on Clarkson's Multi-Platinum album Breakaway (2004).
"Feliz Cumpleaños" is the Spanish version of Mikeyla's "Happy Worst Day".
Although the DVD featured the original live audio, the CD had re-recorded songs, mostly by Anahí, due to her vocal problem at the time the concert was recorded.

Personnel
Credits adapted from the album's liner notes.

Vocals
RBD – all vocals

Musicians

Güido Laris – bajo sexto
Carlos Lara – didgeridoo

Production

Camilo Lara – A&R, executive producer
Melissa Mochulske – A&R coordination
Güido Laris – arrangements, musical director
Iván Machorro – arrangements
Luis Luisillo Miguel – associate producer, photographer
Leyla Hoyle – choir
Maxine Willard Waters – choir 
Daniel Borner – coordination
Fernando Roldán – engineer
Pedro Damián – executive producer
Gustavo Borner – mixing, recording
Rafael Padilla – percussion
Carlos Lara – producer
Marisol Alcelay – product manager
Carolina Palomo Ramos – production coordinator, PR
Raúl González Biestro – Stereo mix producer
Peter Kent – string conductor

Accolades

Charts
Despite its success, the album's debut was not as strong as RBD's first live album, Tour Generación RBD en Vivo. Instead, the album debuted at #74 on the Mexican Top 100 albums chart and peaked at #14 one week later; at MixUp stores, the album debuted at #5 and peaked at #3 on National Sales. In the US, the album debuted at #7 on the  Billboard Top Latin Albums chart, where it peaked at #6 in April 2006. The album was certified 2× Platinum (Latin) in the US on June 9, 2006, for the sales of 120,000 copies. 
This album was released with the Copy Control protection system in some regions.

Weekly charts

Year-end charts

Certifications and sales

Release history

See also
Live In Hollywood (DVD)

References

RBD live albums
2006 live albums